Seattle Metropolitan, or Seattle Met, is a monthly city magazine covering Seattle, Washington. Its first issue was published in March 2006, and features reporting and feature articles on Seattle events, politics, people, dining and restaurants, popular places, and attractions.

Publisher history
The publisher, SagaCity Media, started in 2003 with the magazine Portland Monthly. In 2006, Seattle Metropolitan was started. At the beginning of 2010, the publisher bought magazines from several other cities including Vail-Beaver Creek, Aspen Sojourner, and Park City.

See also
 Portland Monthly

References

External links

Masthead with up-to-date staff listing

2006 establishments in Washington (state)
City guides
Lifestyle magazines published in the United States
Local interest magazines published in the United States
Magazines established in 2006
Magazines published in Seattle